Therese Elssler (5 April 1808, Vienna - 19 November 1878, Merano) was a dancer.

The sisters Therese and Fanny Elssler were both dancers, the former born in 1808, the latter in 1810, both in the Vienna suburb of Gumpendorf.  They were daughters of Johann Florian Elssler, the personal scribe of Joseph Haydn.  They received their first lessons at Friedrich Horschelt's children's ballet in the Theater an der Wien.  They studied dancing with Jean-Pierre Aumer and danced from 1817 to 1825 on the stage of Theater am Kärntnertor and then continued their ballet education in Naples with the great Gaetano Gioja.

They celebrated their first major triumphs in Berlin in 1830.  After they had made a stir and acquired fame and considerable wealth through their art and charming appearance in the capitals of Europe and America, they resigned from the stage in 1841.  Fanny's last performance was in 1851 in Vienna.  After that, she lived on an estate in Hamburg until 1854, then moved to Vienna.

On 20 April 1850, Therese married Prince Adalbert of Prussia morganatically. King Frederick William IV of Prussia created her Baroness of Barnim. They had one son, Adalbert von Barnim, born in 1841 who died in 1860 during an expedition on the Nile. Prince Adalbert died in 1873. After that, she lived in Bad Homburg.

She died on 19 November 1878 in Merano. She was buried under the name Therese von Barnim on the Invalidenfriedhof in Berlin. Her grave is marked with a restitution grave stone.

References

External links

References and Sources 
 
  (additional entry)
  (additional entry)

Austrian ballerinas
Dancers from Vienna
1808 births
1878 deaths
German baronesses
Morganatic spouses of German royalty
19th-century Austrian ballet dancers